Nong Prue 2 Stadium or formally Nongprue Municipality 2 Stadium is a Stadium in Pattaya, Chonburi, Thailand.  It is currently used mostly for football matches.  The stadium holds 6,000 people.

References

See also
 Nong Prue Stadium

Football venues in Thailand
Buildings and structures in Chonburi province
Sport in Chonburi province